Kshitimohan Sen (2 December 1880 – 12 March 1960) was Indian scholar, writer, a Sanskrit professor and an M.A. in Sanskrit from Queen's College, Benares. He was born in a family hailing from Sonarang in Bengal Presidency (now in Bangladesh). He started his working life at the Department of Education, Chamba State. In 1908, at the call of Rabindranath Tagore, he joined Brahmacharyashram. Later he performed responsibility of Adhyaksha of Vidyabhaban. He was the first Deshikottam (1952) of Vishwa Bharati. He was an acting Upacharyas of Visva-Bharati University (1953–1954). He is the maternal grandfather of Amartya Sen.

Books 

 Kabir (1910–11)
 Bharatiya Madhyayuger Sadhanar Dhara (1930)
 Dadu (1935)
 Bharater Sangskrti (1943)
 Banglar Sadhana (1945)
 Yuga Guru Rammohan (1945)
 Jatibhed (1946)
 Banglar Baul (1947)
 Hindu Sangskrtir Svarup (1947)
 Bharater Hindu-Mussalman Yukta Sadhana (1949)
 Prachin Bharate Nari (1950)
 Chinmay Banga (1957)
 Hinduism (1961) 
  Sadhak O Sadhana (2003)

References

External links 
 
 

1880 births
1960 deaths
Academic staff of Visva-Bharati University
Bengali historians